Ann J. Johanson (1934 – 2020) was an American pediatric endocrinologist. She was a professor at the University of Virginia School of Medicine. At UVA, she was the founding director of the Division of Pediatric Endocrinology. In 1971, she and her colleague Robert M. Blizzard first described Johanson-Blizzard Syndrome.

References 

American pediatricians
American pediatric endocrinologists
American women physicians
1934 births
2020 deaths